Police Spy 77 (German: Polizeispionin 77) is a 1930 German crime film directed by Willi Wolff and starring Ellen Richter, Nikolai Malikoff and Robert Garrison. It was shot at the Staaken Studios in Berlin and on location in Antwerp, Brussels and Paris. The film's sets were designed by the art director Walter Reimann.

Cast
Ellen Richter as Nr. 77 
Nikolai Malikoff as Police inspector Goron 
Robert Garrison as Wilhelm, Goron's assistant
Philipp Manning as Desbarreaux, judge
Ralph Arthur Roberts as The "beautiful Bébert"
Yvette Darnys as his wife 
Károly Huszár (Charles Puffy) as Father Lamotte 
Ferdinand von Alten as Count Lettorières 
Jaro Fürth
Bruno Ziener
Hermann Böttcher
Lotte Stein
Heinrich Gotho
Paul Günther

References

External links

1930 crime films
Films of the Weimar Republic
German crime films
Films directed by Willi Wolff
German black-and-white films
Films set in Paris
National Film films
1930s German films
Films shot at Staaken Studios
Films shot in Brussels
Films shot in Antwerp
Films shot in Paris